is a Japanese professional baseball player. He was born on June 2, 1984. He debuted in 2008. Though debuting in 2008, he has only played three years of baseball in the NPB.

References

Living people
1984 births
People from Itami, Hyōgo
Nippon Professional Baseball catchers
Nippon Ham Fighters players
Hokkaido Nippon-Ham Fighters players
Japanese expatriate baseball players in the United States
Honolulu Sharks players